International Schools Association of Thailand (ISAT) is an association of private schools in Thailand, headquartered in Pak Kret, Nonthaburi Province in Greater Bangkok. Its principal 'raison d'etre' is to act as a link between its 45-member international schools, on the one hand, and the Ministry of Education and the Office of the Private Education Commission in particular.

History
The International Schools Association of Thailand was established in 1994.
During the past year, ISAT has been extensively involved with the Department of Export Promotion in the joint marketing of international education both in Thailand and overseas.

Objectives

The issues of new education legislations and educational reforms have also featured high on the agenda over the past year. ISAT has lent its support to this process through assistance in in-service training by arranging placement for Thai teachers and administrators in international schools where they are able to observe modern approaches to teaching and learning first hand.

In addition to disseminating information to its members on educational issues both at home and overseas, its regular meeting provide a forum for discussion, debate and the exchange of views and information. The organization of in-service training courses, particularly in the fields of cross-cultural management and Thai language teaching, also features highly on the list of ISAT's priorities.

The promotion of Thai language and culture in international schools and support for charitable causes are other major aims of the Association as is support for culture and sporting links between international schools in Thailand and abroad and between international schools and Thai educational institutions.

Members Accreditation
The quality of education offered at the International Schools Association of Thailand’s (ISAT) member schools has been recognized by accreditation organizations such as the Western Association of Schools and Colleges (WASC), the New England Association of Schools and Colleges (NEASC) and the Council of International Schools (CIS).

Members
ISAT has over 75 member schools offering a range of curricula from American, British and International Systems.
Adventist International Mission School
American Pacific International School
American School of Bangkok
Anglo Singapore International School
Bangkok Patana School
British International School, Phuket
Bromsgrove International School Thailand
Chiang Mai International School
Chiang Rai International School
Concordian International School
Ekamai International School
Garden International School (Rayong) & Bangkok
Grace International School
Harrow International School
Heathfield International School
International Community School
International School Bangkok
KIS International School
Korean International School of Bangkok
Lanna International School
Lycée Français International de Bangkok
Nakorn Payap International School
New Sathorn International School
NIST International School
Niva International School
Modern Montessori International Pre-School
Pan-Asia International School
Panyaden International School
Prem Tinsulanonda International School
Ramkhamhaeng Advent International School
RIS Swiss Section - Deutschsprachige Schule Bangkok
Ruamrudee International School, Bangkok
Royce Royal International School
Saint John's International School
Shrewsbury International School
Silver Fern International School
Singapore International School of Bangkok
St Andrews International School Bangkok
St. Andrews International School, Rayong
St. Andrews Samakee International School
Thai-Chinese International School
Thai-Japanese Association School
Thai Sikh International School
The Early Learning Centre
The Regent's School
Traill International School
Wells International School

See also

List of international schools in Thailand

References

External links
Home Page

Education in Thailand

International school associations
Private and independent school organizations
1994 establishments in Thailand
Organizations established in 1994